Haidian District is a district of the municipality of Beijing. It is mostly situated in northwestern Beijing, but also to a lesser extent in the west, where it has borders with Xicheng District and Fengtai District.

It is 431 square km in area, making it the second-largest district in urban Beijing area (after Chaoyang), and is home to 3,133,469 inhabitants as of November 2020.

Sister cities 
Since 1992, Haidian District has signed official papers and established Sister City relationship with 14 cities and districts from 10 countries of 4 continents. Some sister cities are shown below:

South America
 Santa Fe, Argentina (May 2010)
 La Falda, Cordoba, Argentina (10 September 2009)

North America
 Cambridge, Massachusetts, United States (8 February 2008)
 Harrisburg, Pennsylvania, United States (15 April 1998)

Europe
 Savonlinna, Finland (9 March 2016)
 Olympia, Peloponnesus, Greece (28 February 2008)
 Groningen, Netherlands (19 October 2004)
 Bures-sur-Yvette, Massy, Palaiseau, in Paris Region, France (4 October 1994)

East Asia
 Seodaemun-gu, Seoul, South Korea (27 September 1995)
 Nerima, Tokyo, Japan (13 October 1992)

Administrative division 
The administrative division of the district was reported as follows:
 22 subdistricts of the city proper of Beijing
 7 towns of which carry the "area" label:

History 
Haidian was originally a village outside of Beijing's Inner City. It was first built in the Yuan Dynasty and became one of the eight major business areas of the capital during the Qing Dynasty and was the seat of such old shops as Lotus White, Quanjude and Hongbin House. The famed Old Summer Palace and Summer Palace, two grand imperial gardens are also among its reputed features.  It became a university district after the building of the Tsinghua University and Yenching University campus in the early twentieth century. It is mentioned in Lao She's novel Camel Xiangzi as an academic village for students. After the foundation of the People's Republic, it was deliberately developed as a university area, with many of the Yan'an institutions moving there. It officially became an administrative district in June 1954. Since the reform and opening up, it has become the centre of China's IT industry. In the words of Time magazine:

During the later half of the 1990s, out of the Beijing districts, Haidian had the highest per capita GDP. During that period the GDP of Haidian (1) District grew by double digits each year.

Transportation 
The northwestern stretches of the 3rd Ring Road, 4th Ring Road, 5th Ring Road and 6th Ring Road all run through the area.

Metro & light rail
Haidian is currently served by ten metro lines of the Beijing Subway and one light rail line:
  - Yuquanlu, Wukesong, Wanshoulu, Gongzhufen, Military Museum 
  - Anheqiao North, Beigongmen, Xiyuan , Yuanmingyuan Park, East Gate of Peking University, Zhongguancun, Haidianhuangzhuang , Renmin University, Weigongcun, National Library 
  - Liaogongzhuang, Tiancun, Haidian Wuluju, Cishousi , Huayuanqiao, Baishiqiao South 
  - Yuxin, Xixiaokou, Yongtaizhuang
  - National Library , Baishiqiao South , Baiduizi, Military Museum 
  - Lianhuaqiao, Gongzhufen , Xidiaoyutai, Cishousi , Chedaogou, Changchunqiao, Huoqiying, Bagou , Suzhoujie, Haidianhuangzhuang , Zhichunli, Zhichunlu , Xitucheng, Mudanyuan , Jiandemen
  - Dazhongsi, Zhichunlu , Wudaokou, Shangdi, Qinghe railway station , Xi'erqi 
  - Qinghuadongluxikou, Liudaokou, Beishatan
  - Beianhe, Wenyanglu, Daoxianghulu, Tundian, Yongfeng, Yongfeng South, Xibeiwang, Malianwa, Nongdananlu, Xiyuan , Wanquanheqiao, Suzhouqiao, Wanshousi, Guojia Tushuguan (National Library) , Ganjiakou, Yuyuantan Dongmen (Yuyuantan Park East Gate), Muxidi 
  - Mudanyuan , Beitaipingzhuang
  - Xi'erqi , Qinghe railway station 
  - Fragrant Hills, Botanical Garden, Wan'an, West Gate of Summer Palace, Bagou Station

Suburban Railway
Haidian is served by one commuter line operated by Beijing Suburban Railway (BCR).

  - Qinghe railway station

Government and infrastructure 

The China National Space Administration has its headquarters in the district. The Beijing Aerospace Flight Control Center which serves as the central command center for the Chinese space program is also located in the district.

The State Administration of Foreign Experts Affairs (SAFEA) has its headquarters in Zhongguancun.

The People's Liberation Army Military Music Hall is located in the district.

The Ministry of State Security has facilities operating in the district.

Economy 

In 2017, the regional GDP was 592.48 billion yuan, with a GDP per capita at 170.8 thousand yuan (25293 US dollars).

A central part of Haidian's economy, the Zhongguancun electronics district, hosts the Beijing offices of many software and computer-technology companies.

 Baidu has its headquarters in the Baidu Campus. 
 Sohu has its headquarters in the Sohu.com Internet Plaza. 
 Sinosteel's headquarters are in the Sinosteel Plaza in Haidian District. 
 Youku has its headquarters on the fifth floor of Sinosteel Plaza. 
 Wumart has its headquarters in the Wumart Commercial Building in Haidian District. 
 aigo's head office is in the Ideal Plaza in the Haidian District.
 China Postal Airlines has its headquarters on the 11th through 14th floors of the Ziyu Office Building in Haidian District.
 Sinovac Biotech 
 The Beijing Civil Aircraft Technology Research Center of COMAC has its offices on the 8th floor of the Beijing Olympic Building in Haidian District.
 Xiaomi has its headquarters in the Office Building of Huarun Wucai City.
 Nuctech.
 New Oriental
 Google has its Beijing office in Tsinghua Science Park Bldg 6
 Everbright International has its Beijing office in the Beijing International Building (北京国际大厦) in Zhongguancun.
 ByteDance (developer of Douyin / TikTok) has its global headquarters on Zhichun Road (知春路), Haidian District.
 Lenovo has its global headquarters in Lenovo Campus, Haidian District.
 Grab has its Beijing office in Raycom Infotech Park.

Education

Higher education

Institutions of higher education in Haidian include:
 Beihang University (formerly Beijing University of Aeronautics and Astronautics)
 Beijing Film Academy
 Beijing Foreign Studies University
 Beijing Forestry University
 Beijing Institute of Technology
 Beijing Jiaotong University
 Beijing Language and Culture University
 Beijing Normal University
 Beijing Sport University
 Capital Normal University
 China Agricultural University
 China University of Geosciences Beijing
 China University of Political Science and Law
 Minzu University of China (formerly Central University for Nationalities)
 Peking University
 Renmin University of China
 Tsinghua University
 University of International Relations
 University of Science and Technology Beijing

Primary and secondary education

The Beijing Municipal Commission of Education, the local education authority, has its headquarters in the Beijing Olympic Building.

Institutions of secondary education 
 Beijing Bayi School
 Beijing 101 Middle School
 Affiliated High School of Peking University
 The High School Affiliated to Renmin University of China
 Tsinghua University High School

Private schools include:
 Beijing Haidian Foreign Language Shi Yan School (elementary through senior high school)
Beijing Haidian International School
 Saint Paul American School

Communities 
 Zhongguancun
 Wudaokou
 Madian
 Xinjiangcun (demolished)

Important areas in Haidian District 

 Old Summer Palace (Yuanmingyuan Park)
 Summer Palace (Yiheyuan)
 Fragrant Hills (Xiangshan or Jingyi Palace)
 Beijing Botanical Garden (Beijing Zhiwuyuan)
 Jade Spring Hill (Yuquanshan or Jingming Palace)
 Haidian Park
 Pagoda at the Wuta Temple
 Purple Bamboo Park (Zizhuyuan)
 Yuyuantan Park
 Diaoyutai State Guesthouse
 Baidu headquarters
 Sohu headquarters
 Sinosteel Plaza
 Youku headquarters
 Haidian Christian Church

Sports
The Chinese Ice Hockey Association, which governs ice hockey and bandy in China, has its offices at 56, Zhongguacun South Street in Haidian District.

Gallery

Haidian's Technology hubs

Climate 

Haidian has a humid continental climate (Köppen climate classification Dwa).

Notes

References

External links 

 Haidian District, Beijing Municipality 
 Haidian District, Beijing Municipality 

 
Districts of Beijing